These are the results of athletics competition at the 1912 Summer Olympics.  30 events were contested, all for men only.

The athletics programme grew by 4 events since the 1908 Summer Olympics.  The 5000 and 10000 metre races were introduced, as the 5 mile event was eliminated.  The 400 metre hurdle event made a brief disappearance, making the 1912 Olympics the only time that event was not held since its introduction in 1900.  The 4x100 and 4x400 relays replaced the medley relay while the team race was shortened from 3 miles to 3000 metres.  The decathlon, which had been held in 1904 but not in 1908, returned to the programme.  Steeplechasing was eliminated, while racewalking was cut from 2 events to 1 with the 10 kilometre replacing the 10 mile and the 3500 metre eliminated.  The pentathlon was introduced (as well as the separate sport modern pentathlon).  The 1908 experiments of the Greek-style discus and the restricted javelin were replaced with two-handed throwing, for the shot put, discus, and javelin.  Cross-country events, both for the individual and the team, were introduced. The competitions were held from Saturday, July 6, 1912, to Monday, July 15, 1912.

Medal summary

Medal table

Participating nations
556 athletes from 27 nations competed. Egypt was the only nation not to compete in athletics.

References
 International Olympic Committee medal database

 
1912 Summer Olympics events
1912
International athletics competitions hosted by Sweden
Olympics